Sepia filibrachia is a species of cuttlefish native to the South China Sea. Its natural range covers the waters off Taiwan, Haikou on Hainan Island, and Guryanova in the Gulf of Tonkin, Vietnam. It lives at depths of 34 to 95 m.

Females are on average slightly larger than males. They grow to 70 mm and 62 mm in mantle length, respectively.

The type specimen was collected off Ling Yuan, Kaohsiung, Taiwan.

S. filibrachia is of commercial interest to fisheries and is marketed in Taiwan.

Notes
a. Including Mu-Do-Yu, Peng-Hu, Wu-chi, and Taichung.
b.

References

Cuttlefish
Molluscs described in 2005
Taxa named by Amanda Reid (malacologist)